This is a list of past baseball playoff champions of the Intercounty Baseball League, an independent baseball league in Ontario.

The team with most championships (16) are the Stratford Nationals/Kraven Knits/Hillers.

*Source: Intercounty Baseball League 2011 Information Guide &i Record Book

Championships by Team

References 

Intercounty Baseball League